Bliss is a 1993 album by 12 Rods.

Track listing 
All songs written by Ryan Olcott, except where noted.
 "Stella" (4:17)
 "Repeat" (4:35)
 "Choke" (Olcott, Dan Perlin 2:12)
 "When Comes Sunday" (5:15)
 "Day By Day" (3:32)
 "I Am Faster" (4:53)
 "Come Down On Me" (5:50)
 "Megabright" (6:26)
 "Tell a Lie" (5:19)
 "Mr. Whipple" (Olcott, Perlin 2:51)
 "Bliss" (5:07)
 "Rainman" (3:22)

Personnel

12 Rods
Ryan Olcott: Vocals, Guitars
Matt Flynn: Bass
Christopher McGuire: Drums

Additional Personnel
EV Olcott: Saxophone, Recorder, Keyboards

1993 albums
12 Rods albums